Michael Grahame Ward  (born 18 July 1942) is a former Green Party of Aotearoa New Zealand politician. He was an MP for one term from 2002 to 2005. He was co-leader of the Values Party (a predecessor to the modern Greens) from 1985 to 1988. In 2006, Ward was an unsuccessful candidate for male co-leader of the Green Party, following the death of Rod Donald in 2005.

Early life
Born in 1942, Ward was educated at Nelson College from 1956 to 1959. He attended Christchurch Teachers College from 1962 to 1963, gaining a Diploma of Teaching, and worked as a primary school teacher in 1964.  He then studied at the University of Canterbury from 1965 to 1968 and was awarded a Diploma of Fine Arts majoring in sculpture. He worked as a secondary school teacher between 1969 and 1977.

Political career

Parliament

Ward was an unsuccessful candidate at seven New Zealand general elections before being elected in the 2002 general election at No. 9 on the Green party list, after the counting of special votes. Although he moved up one place on the list for the 2005 election he lost his seat as the Green vote fell. When he was in Parliament, he was the Green Party spokesperson on Arts and Culture, Older Persons, Small Business, Sports, Fitness and Leisure, Tourism and Waste-free. These portfolios were taken over by the remaining six Green MPs after Ward lost his seat.

Ward was a Values Party candidate in the 1981, 1984 and 1987 elections. He was a Green Party candidate in the 1990 election. He was an Alliance candidate in the 1993 and 1996 elections. He was a Green Party candidate in the 1999, 2002 and 2005 elections.

Ward was next on the Green party list before Nándor Tánczos resigned in 2008. Ward initially declined to stand aside so that Russel Norman, the Green co-leader, could take Tánczos's list seat when he resigned from Parliament. Ward changed his mind, because of the advantages in having the party co-leader in Parliament during an election year, and Norman became an MP on 27 June.

Nelson City Council

Ward served as a Nelson City Councillor from 1983 to 1989,  from 1992 to 1998 and from 2011 to 2016. He stood as a candidate for Mayor of Nelson in 1986, 1989 and in 2007. He came a close second in 1989 and came fourth in 2007. He unsuccessfully stood for mayor in 2010. and stood again for mayor in 2019, coming fifth.

Creative Alliance 
In May 2017, Ward announced the formation of a new political party called Creative Alliance. However, as of July 2019 the party has not stood in any elections and is not registered.

Other activities

In 2005, shortly after that year's general election, Ward won the Montana World of Wearable Art Supreme Award. Ward is the only person who completed all the first 28 Coast to Coast races. Ward is also an appointed Justice of the Peace.

References

1942 births
Living people
People educated at Nelson College
University of Canterbury alumni
New Zealand schoolteachers
Green Party of Aotearoa New Zealand MPs
Nelson City Councillors
New Zealand sportsperson-politicians
Values Party politicians
New Zealand list MPs
21st-century New Zealand politicians
Members of the New Zealand House of Representatives
People from Hastings, New Zealand
Unsuccessful candidates in the 1981 New Zealand general election
Unsuccessful candidates in the 1984 New Zealand general election
Unsuccessful candidates in the 1987 New Zealand general election
Unsuccessful candidates in the 1990 New Zealand general election
Unsuccessful candidates in the 1993 New Zealand general election
Unsuccessful candidates in the 1996 New Zealand general election
Unsuccessful candidates in the 1999 New Zealand general election
Unsuccessful candidates in the 2005 New Zealand general election
Unsuccessful candidates in the 2008 New Zealand general election
Unsuccessful candidates in the 2011 New Zealand general election
New Zealand justices of the peace
New Zealand male triathletes